The following is a list of Japanese pattern coins from the yen based currency system started under the Meiji Restoration. The first patterns of the yen based system were made from 1869 to 1870 as presentation pieces to the Emperor. The new currency system was eventually adopted by the Meiji government in an Act signed on June 27, 1871. Pattern coins are almost never released into circulation as they are made for evaluation purposes only. Once a pattern is approved by government officials, it then goes to the minting process. Most of the patterns listed below are very rare, and sell for considerable amounts at auctions. The market value and rarity of any given coin is dependent on supply and demand.

Selected terminology

The following terms appear on the list below:

Legend(s) - In numismatic terminology "legends" refer to inscriptions on any given coin.

Obverse/Reverse - These refer to the front (o) and back (r) side of a coin.

Variety - Coins struck with minor changes to their initial design are called "varieties".

Meiji
Note: Early Japanese coins are read clockwise from right to left, while modern coins are read counterclockwise from right to left.

Early proposals

Rin

Sen

Yen

Trade dollars

Taishō
Note: Early Japanese coins are read clockwise from right to left, while modern coins are read counterclockwise from right to left.

Rin and Sen

Shōwa
Note: Early Japanese coins (until 1945-1946) are read clockwise from right to left, while modern coins are read counterclockwise from right to left.

Sen

Yen

Notes

References

Coins of Japan
Numismatics
1871 introductions